A runway incursion is an aviation incident involving improper positioning of vehicles or people on any airport runway or its protected area.  When an incursion involves an active runway being used by arriving or departing aircraft, the potential for a collision hazard or Instrument Landing System (ILS) interference can exist.  At present, various runway safety technologies and processes are commonly employed to reduce the risk and potential consequences of such an event.

Definition

The internationally-accepted definition of a runway incursion is:

In the United States, the FAA classifies runway incursions into 3 types, with 5 levels of severity:

Analysis 
Formal study of runway incursions began in the 1980s, following several high-profile near misses and fatal collisions of airliners operating on airport surfaces.  One of the earliest reports on the topic was published in 1986 by the American National Transportation Safety Board (NTSB), titled Runway Incursions at Controlled Airports in the United States.  Citing examples like the Tenerife airport disaster and the 1972 Chicago–O'Hare runway collision, a special investigation was opened "to investigate selected runway incursions to determine their underlying causes and to recommend appropriate remedial actions."  After detailed examination of 26 incursion incidents occurring in 1985, investigators compiled a list of conclusions and safety recommendations.  Among their findings were a need for clearer airport signage, improved controller supervision, and revised training procedures for aircrews and controllers.  Despite the valuable data generated by the investigation, the NTSB conceded that, at the time, "the magnitude of the runway incursion problem could not be measured because of both incomplete reporting and follow-up investigations by the FAA."

Two years later in 1988, the Federal Aviation Administration issued its own report, Reducing Runway Incursions, with the purpose of establishing an integrated program for runway incursion reduction.  Its general recommendations included:

 Establish a steering committee on runway incursion reduction
 Accelerate development and field deployment of Airport Movement Area Safety System technology
 Emphasize the analysis of pilot-related causal factors
In January 1991, the FAA published the first edition of its biennial Runway Incursion Plan (now known as the National Runway Safety Plan).  The document introduced organizational and legislative reforms alongside new initiatives to leverage research on human factors, design, technological innovation, and professional development. In August 1992, however, a US General Accounting Office (GAO) congressional testimony criticized the agency's budgeting, delayed implementation, and inadequate reporting of the initiatives, especially its rollout of ASDE-3 radar and Traffic Collision Avoidance System (TCAS) technologies.

Despite newfound emphasis on runway incursion prevention, another fatal accident occurred on 30 December, 1990, when eight people were killed after two Northwest Airlines flights collided in fog at Detroit Metropolitan Airport.  The NTSB determined the accident's probable cause to be pilot error due to communication errors, inadequate crew resource management (CRM), and disorientation exacerbated by deficient airfield geometry.  Additionally, the NTSB recommended stricter airport certification requirements under 14 CFR Part 139 in the areas of lighting and conspicuous markings/signage. 

In 2000, research into incursions at uncontrolled and non-towered airports was conducted by the Aviation Safety Reporting System based on data gathered by interviewing pilots who had experienced a runway incursion.  Interviews lasted around 45 minutes to 1 hour, and the data was de-identified for FAA use in developing safety measures.

In 2005, the FAA assisted ICAO in its creation of a formal, internationally-accepted definition of a runway incursion.  The new verbiage was first added to the fourteenth edition of PANS-OPS Doc 4444, but it was not until 1 October 2007 that the FAA finally adopted the ICAO definition.  Previously, the FAA had maintained that an incursion only included incidents in which a potential traffic conflict existed.  An event without a potential conflict– such as an unauthorized aircraft crossing an empty runway– had been defined as a 'surface incident'.

As of 2017, the last fatal runway incursion accident involving a U.S. Federal Aviation Regulations Part 121 air carrier was in 2006.

Between 2011 and 2017, 12,857 runway incursions were reported in the United States. Between October 2016 and September 2017, 1,341 were reported. Of these, six were placed in the most serious categories A and B. Four of these were considered ATC incidents, and two were "pilot deviations". Of the 1,341 incidents, 66 percent were caused by pilot deviation, 17 percent were vehicle/pedestrian incidents, 16 percent were air traffic control (ATC) incidents, and 1 percent were "other".

An FAA study of the year ending September 2016, found that of 361 runway incursions attributed to pilot deviation, 27 percent resulted from "pilot failed to hold short of runway as instructed", and 14.7 percent from "pilot failed to hold short of runway". 5 percent of pilot deviations were classified as the pilot failing to comply with an ATC clearance. In 3.4 percent of deviations, the pilot departed without a departure clearance.

The NASA Aviation Safety Reporting Service (ASRS) received 11,168 reports of runway incursions between January 2012 to August 2017, at a rate of approximately 2000 per year. More than 40 percent of reports were filed by general aviation pilots, and 36 percent by air carrier pilots. Factors included situational awareness, communication breakdown, confusion, and distraction.

Technology 

The Airport Surface Detection Equipment, Model X (ASDE-X) and the Airport Movement Area Safety System (AMASS) are computerized systems that are intended to alert air traffic controllers to the potential for a runway incursion.

The Honeywell Runway Awareness and Advisory System alerts pilots to the potential for a runway incursion.

Serious and fatal runway incursions 

Tenerife airport disaster – On March 27, 1977, two Boeing 747 passenger jets, KLM Flight 4805 and Pan Am Flight 1736, collided on the runway at Los Rodeos Airport (now Tenerife North Airport), on the Spanish island of Tenerife, Canary Islands, killing 583 people, making it the deadliest accident in aviation history.
Aeroflot Flight 3352 – On October 11, 1984, a Tupolev Tu-154B-1 hit maintenance vehicles on the runway while attempting to land in Omsk, Russia. The ground controller allowed maintenance workers to dry the runway during heavy rain and fell asleep on the job. 174 people aboard the aircraft were killed, along with four workers on the ground. This incursion is the deadliest aviation accident in Russian territory.
In the 1972 Chicago–O'Hare runway collision, North Central Airlines Flight 575 (a McDonnell Douglas DC-9) collided during its takeoff roll with Delta Air Lines Flight 954 (a Convair CV-880) while the CV-880 was taxiing across a fog-shrouded runway at O'Hare International Airport in Chicago, Illinois, killing ten people and injuring 17.
In New Zealand, during the 1981 Springbok Tour, a number of protesters blocked the runway at Wellington Airport, forcing an Air New Zealand Fokker Friendship to abort its landing, another F27 to circle the airport for several minutes and delaying two departures.
 The 1990 Wayne County Airport runway collision occurred when Northwest Airlines Flight 1482, operated by a McDonnell-Douglas DC-9, taxied onto an active runway in heavy fog at the same time as Northwest Airlines Flight 299, operated by a Boeing 727, was undertaking its takeoff roll. The 727's wing sliced through the DC-9's fuselage, killing eight people aboard the latter aircraft, which was subsequently destroyed by fire; the 727 sustained damage to its wing, but was able to perform a rejected takeoff and stop safely on the remaining runway, and was later repaired and returned to service.
USAir Flight 1493 was a scheduled passenger flight from Syracuse Hancock International Airport, New York, to San Francisco International Airport, via Washington, D.C.; Columbus, Ohio; and Los Angeles. On the evening of February 1, 1991, the Boeing 737-300 serving the flight accidentally collided with SkyWest Flight 5569, a Metroliner turboprop aircraft, upon landing at Los Angeles.
1994 TWA Flight 427/Superior Aviation Cessna 441 Conquest II, 22 November 1994: Cessna pilot error at Lambert-St. Louis International Airport. The pilot taxied to an incorrect runway and was struck by departing TWA MD-80; there were two fatalities on the Cessna.
On 16 November 1996, United Express Flight 5925 was landing at Quincy Regional Airport when the pilot of a Beechcraft King Air started to takeoff on an intersecting runway. As the field was uncontrolled, the United Express pilots inquired whether the King Air was clear of the runways. They received no response except for a call from a Piper Cherokee saying they were holding short. The King Air and United Express collided at the intersection of the two runways killing all 12 on board Flight 5925 and the pilot and passenger of the Beechcraft King Air.
On 1 April 1999, an Air China Boeing 747, Flight 9018, taxied onto an active runway at Chicago's O'Hare International Airport during the takeoff of Korean Air Flight 036, another 747. There were 8 people on the Air China jet, and 379 on the South Korean flight.
1999 T. F. Green Airport runway incursion, 6 December 1999: In low visibility at night, a United Airlines 757 turned down the wrong taxiway and taxied onto the active runway just as a FedEx Express 727 took off. No collision occurred.
On 25 May 2000, at Charles de Gaulle Airport, France, a McDonnell Douglas MD-83 operating as Air Liberte Flight 8807 collided with a Shorts 330-200 with its left wing while taking off. One of the pilots in the Shorts 330-200 was killed; the other pilot was seriously injured. The MD-83 aborted takeoff at a speed of 155 knots. There were no injuries to the 151 passengers and 6 crew members on the MD-83. The MD-83 sustained substantial damage to its left wing but was later repaired. An investigation concluded that the runway incursion was caused by ATC error.
Linate Airport disaster, 8 October 2001: Scandinavian flight 686 collided on takeoff with a Cessna Citation registered D-IEVX that had turned onto the wrong taxiway, causing it to enter the runway.
2004 Indian Ocean tsunami aftermath, Banda Aceh 4 January 2005: water buffalo on runway caused ground collision which seriously delayed relief flights.
On 9 June 2005, US Airways Flight 1170, a Boeing 737-300, nearly collided with Aer Lingus Flight 132, an Airbus A330 at Logan International Airport in Boston after both flights were given nearly simultaneous clearances for takeoff on intersecting runways. The US Airways flight kept its nose down on the runway for an extended amount of time to go underneath the Aer Lingus flight and avoided a collision.
On 18 August 2012, a Cessna 172N Ram killed a worker mowing the grass at Ōtone Airfield, during a touch and go attempt.
On 20 October 2014, a Dassault Falcon 50 collided on takeoff with a snow plow that had strayed onto the runway at Moscow Vnukovo Airport, killing Total oil company Chairman and CEO Christophe de Margerie.
On 11 October 2016, China Eastern Airlines Flight MU5643, an Airbus A320 (Registration B-2337), nearly collided with Flight MU5106 of the same airline, an Airbus A330 at Shanghai Hongqiao International Airport in Shanghai, China, when the former was taking off on runway 36L while the latter was crossing the same runway under wrong instruction. The former performed a TOGA takeoff, managed to climb over the latter and avoided a collision.
On 13 February 2017, an Aviat Husky piloted by actor Harrison Ford, landed on Taxiway C at John Wayne Airport instead of Runway 20L barely missing an American 737 waiting to takeoff. No one was hurt in the incident.
 On 7 May 2020, an adult male intruder entered the grounds of Austin–Bergstrom International Airport and made his way to the airport's runway 17R, being struck and killed by a Boeing 737-7H4 operating Southwest Airlines Flight 1392 as it landed at the airport. There were no injuries or fatalities to the 58 people on board the aircraft, although substantial damage was sustained to the 737's left engine nacelle.
 On 2 September 2022, engine 2 of TAP Air Portugal Flight 1492, an Airbus A320-251N, struck a motorcycle that crossed the runway at Ahmed Sékou Touré International Airport during the plane’s landing roll. Both riders on the motorcycle perished, however everyone on board the plane were unharmed. Engine 2 of the plane was damaged from the collision.
On 18 November 2022, a LATAM Perú Airbus A320neo taking off from Jorge Chávez International Airport as LATAM Perú Flight 2213 to Juliaca collided with an airport fire engine that was crossing the runway, killing two firefighters and injuring a third. All 102 passengers and six crew members aboard escaped unharmed, but the aircraft sustained critical damage and was written off.

References

External links

FAA Runway Safety Statistics

 
Aviation accidents and incidents
Aviation risks
Runway safety